Prevalje (German: Prävali) is a settlement in northern Slovenia. It is the seat of the Municipality of Prevalje. It lies in the traditional Slovenian province of Carinthia. Prevalje lies in a valley where the Meža River emerges from a narrow gorge, full of fluvioglacial sediments. To the north the settlement is bounded by the Strojna, Stražišče, and Dolga Brda hills. To the south are Navrski vrh and Riflov vrh.

History
The area around Prevalje was settled in prehistoric times, attested by archeological finds which include a bronze axe of the Hallstatt culture. In 1860, approximately 50 Roman marble slabs were found in the riverbed below today's cellulose and cardboard factory at Paloma in Zagrad. The stones belonged to a large tomb on the Roman road from Celeia to Virunum. At the nearby Brančurnik pub, a Roman sarcophagus known as the Brančurnik Bench can be seen.

One of the last battles of the Second World War in Europe, the Battle of Poljana, was fought nearby on 14 and 15 May 1945 between the Yugoslav army and retreating Axis forces. In 2010, Slovenian officials discovered a mass grave containing the remains of approximately 700 men and women killed by units of KNOJ in 1945.

Geography
The historical center of Prevalje is on the left bank of the Meža, on the north edge of the valley, in the hamlet of Na Fari around the parish church dedicated to the Assumption of Mary, known locally as Mary on the Lake. It was originally a late Romanesque building, first mentioned in written documents dating to 1335, but the current church dates to 1890. A second historical centre lies around the confluence of Leše Creek with the Meža. This is where the first industrial companies were established at the beginning of the 18th century, laying the foundations for rapid economic development of the area.

Economy
Prevalje was an important ironworking centre. The development of the town was closely connected the iron industry. Even today the processing industry forms an important basis for the economy of Prevalje, followed by trade, metal processing, traffic and building industry. In recent years services and tourism have also increased.

The biggest companies in the Prevalje as of 2003 include Lesna (furniture industry), Koratur (coach and bus companies), Prevent (textile industry), Lek (pharmaceuticals), Jamnica (trade), Paloma (paper industry), and Instalater (engineering, services). There are also several elementary schools, a nursery school, preschools, a medical clinic, a bank, and a post office in the town.

Sports
Prevalje Stadium, also named Športni park Ugasle peči, is a multi-purpose stadium in Prevalje. It is used mostly for football matches and is the home ground of DNŠ Prevalje. The stadium was built in 1942 and is currently able to accommodate 500 seated spectators. NK Korotan Prevalje, now defunct, competed in the Slovenian PrvaLiga for nine seasons.

Notable natives and residents
Franc Lampret, composer (1923–1997)
Lojze Lebič (born 1934), composer and conductor
Vinko Ošlak, essayist, translator and Christian thinker
Danilo Slivnik (1950–2012), journalist, editor and columnist
Leopold Suhodolčan, writer
Franc Sušnik Jr. (1930–1996), botanist
Franc Sušnik Sr. (1898–1980), author, professor
BQL, music group
Milko Šparemblek, dancer, choreographer, stage director, film director

References

External links

Prevalje on Geopedia

Populated places in the Municipality of Prevalje
Cities and towns in Carinthia (Slovenia)